Great Migration, Great Migrations, or The Great Migration may refer to:

Historical events
 The Migration Period of Europe from 400 to 800 AD
 Great Migration of Puritans from England to New England (1620–1643)
 Great Migrations of the Serbs from the Ottoman Empire to the Habsburg Monarchy (1690 and 1737)
 Great Migration of Canada, increased migration to Canada (approximately 1815–1850)
 Great Migration, resulting from the 1947 Partition of British India
 African American "Great Migrations":
 The original Great Migration (African American) from the southern United States to the northern United States (1910–1930)
 The Second Great Migration (African American) from the southern United States to the northern and western United States (1941–1970)
 The New Great Migration, reverse migration from the North, Midwest and the West to the southern United States (1965–present)
 The Great Migration of 1843, the first large group of settlers to travel via the Oregon Trail to the Oregon Country
 The Great Trek of South African Boers away from British colonial power
 Great Emigration of Poles
The Great Migration or Great Fleet, the traditional Māori recount of their arrival in New Zealand

Nature
 Great migration, a yearly wildebeest migration in the Serengeti

Arts and media 
Great Migrations, 2010 National Geographic nature documentary television miniseries
 The Great Migration (album), 2006 album by rapper Bronze Nazareth
 Great Migrations (Greyhawk), fictional migrations in Dungeons & Dragons: World of Greyhawk

See also
Great Trek
Mass migration
Forced migration
Human migration
Great Upheaval
Early human migrations
Pre-modern human migration
Indo-European migrations
Great American Interchange